Ringsted railway station ( or Ringsted Banegård) is a railway station serving the town of Ringsted in central Zealand, Denmark. It is located in the centre of the town, on the southern edge of the historic town centre, and immediately adjacent to the Ringsted bus station.

Ringsted station is an important railway junction where the main line Copenhagen–Fredericia, Copenhagen–Ringsted, and South Line railway lines all meet. The station opened in 1856, and its second and current station building designed by the architect Knud Tanggaard Seest was inaugurated in 1924. The station offers direct Intercity rail services to Funen, Jutland and Copenhagen, as well as regional rail services to Copenhagen, Odense and Næstved, all operated by the national railway company DSB.

History

Ringsted railway station opened on 27 April 1856, as the Copenhagen-Roskilde railway line from Copenhagen to Roskilde, the first railway line in the Kingdom of Denmark, was prolonged from Roskilde to the port city of Korsør on the west coast of Zealand by the Great Belt in 1856.

With the increasing traffic, the original station building from 1856 became too small, and in 1924 the second and current station building was inaugurated.

On 31 May 2019, a new high-speed railway line between Copenhagen and Ringsted via the new Køge North railway station was inaugurated.

See also
 List of railway stations in Denmark
 Rail transport in Denmark

Notes and References

Notes

Citations

Bibliography

External links

 Banedanmark – government agency responsible for maintenance and traffic control of most of the Danish railway network
 DSB – the Danish national train operating company
 Danske Jernbaner – website with information on railway history in Denmark

railway station
Railway stations in Region Zealand
Buildings and structures in Ringsted Municipality
Railway stations opened in 1856
1856 establishments in Denmark
Knud Tanggaard Seest railway stations
Railway stations in Denmark opened in the 19th century